The Brødrene Rocks are a group of rocks lying in the entrance to Wheeler Bay, just northwest of Magnet Bay. They were mapped by Norwegian cartographers from aerial photos taken by the Lars Christensen Expedition, 1936–37, and named Brødrene ('the brothers').

References

 

Rock formations of Antarctica
Landforms of Enderby Land